The Al Fahd 300 was an Iraqi solid-propelled short-range ballistic missile that was based on the Soviet S-75 Dvina surface-to-air missile. Its expected range was 300 km, which violated the limits provided by UNSC 687 which stipulated that Iraq was only allowed to have missiles with a range lower than 150 km. The missile project was thus halted and declared abandoned by 1993.

Development and operational history
In August 1991 Iraq secretly started work on the J-1 surface-to-surface missile based on the S-75 Dvina without notifying UNSCOM. During the development of the missile the Ababil-100 had already been declared and Iraq later on admitted to hiding its Fahd missile project with the Ababil-100 as similarities would be observed between J-1 and Ababil-100. Iraq had declared the project abandoned in May 1993, and had had six tests between January and April 1993 and provided UNSCOM details. Iraq had declared the range to be 134 km but UNSCOM could not verify it. Lt.Gen Hussein Kamel al-Majid had issued the orders for the project and its secrecy. 21 flight tests were claimed overall and the UNSCOM ordered the destruction for 9 of such missiles.

Al Fahd 500
The 500 km range version although being displayed at the 1989 Baghdad arms exposition did not reach the design stage and according to Pentagon Opinion was a mock-up for a propaganda campaign.

See also
Qaher-1, a Houthi surface-to-surface missile also based on S-75 Dvina
Prithvi-I , an Indian surface-to-surface missile also based on S-75 Dvina
Al Fat'h solid propelled missile with some similarities
Al Samoud liquid propelled missile with some similarities

References 

Military history of Iraq
Short-range ballistic missiles of Iraq
Ballistic missiles of Iraq
Surface-to-surface missiles of Iraq
Theatre ballistic missiles